St Martin's Church in Cathedral Close, Exeter, Devon, England was built in the 15th century. It is recorded in the National Heritage List for England as a designated Grade I listed building, and is now a redundant church in the care of the Churches Conservation Trust.  It was vested in the Trust on 1 August 1995.

It is built of Heavitree stone and has slate roofs. The chancel arch is thought to be the oldest part of the building, and may date from the previous church on the site which was consecrated on 6 July 1065 by Bishop Leofric. There are traces of Anglo-Saxon long-and-short work high in the north-east corner of the nave. The tower was added in 1675.

The interior contains 17th and 18th century monuments, reredos and altar rails, some of which were brought from the nearby St Paul's, which was demolished in 1936. The south window contains a few fragments of medieval glass. At the west end is a panelled gallery with the painted arms of Bishop Trelawny (1688—1707) and the City of Exeter, both flanking the royal coat of arms.

See also
 List of churches preserved by the Churches Conservation Trust in South West England

References

Further reading
Orme, Nicholas (2014) The Churches of Medieval Exeter, Impress Books, ISBN 9781907605512; pp. 130-32.

15th-century church buildings in England
Church of England church buildings in Devon
Grade I listed churches in Devon
Churches preserved by the Churches Conservation Trust
Saint Martin